Gogo is a department or commune of Zoundwéogo Province in central Burkina Faso.

Towns and villages
The capital of Gogo Department is the town of Gogo.

References

Departments of Burkina Faso
Zoundwéogo Province